Bornsjön is a lake at Södertörn in Salem Municipality in Södermanland, Sweden. It is part of Norrström's main catchment area. In test fishing, a large number of fish species have been caught, including European perch, white bream, common bream and ruffe.

The lake is within the boundaries of the Bornsjön Nature Reserve, and has been sheltered since 1920.

Lakes of Stockholm County